Jones syndrome is an extremely rare disorder characterized by gingival fibromatosis and sensorineural hearing loss. The condition is an inherited but the underlying genetic cause is currently unknown.

Epidemiology 
Fewer than 100 cases have been published. According to Orphanet it has been reported in two families.

Treatment 
Due to the condition's rarity there are no treatment guidelines.

References 

Rare diseases
Hearing loss
Genetic diseases and disorders